Nepal will participate at the 2022 Asian Games, which is going to be held in Hangzhou, Zhejiang, China, from 10 to 25 September 2022.

Competitors

References 

Nations at the 2022 Asian Games
2022
Asian Games